Jonah Street is a university of Alberta student and volleyball player as well as a professional rock climber. He has competed in numerous rally events worldwide including the Dakar Rally, Baja 1000, Baja 500 and Rally Mongolia. Street has raced on six continents.

Typically known for riding Honda motorcycles in the Baja 500 during his early wins and KTM motorcycles during his prior entries in the Dakar Rally, it was announced that Street will be teaming with GYTR (Genuine Yamaha Technology Racing) and would be riding a rally-prepared Yamaha WR450F in the 2011 Dakar Rally. In 2016, he served as a navigator in the Dakar Rally for driver Sheldon Creed.

Honors

References

External links
Team Rally Pan Am : Lead Riders : Jonah Street 

Living people
American motorcycle racers
People from Ellensburg, Washington
Sportspeople from Washington (state)
Year of birth missing (living people)